Godley Independent School District is a public school district based in Godley, Texas (USA).

In 2010, the school district was rated "Recognized" by the Texas Education Agency.

Schools
Godley High School (Grades 9-12)
Godley Middle School (Grades 7-8)
Godley 6th Grade Campus (Grade 6)
Legacy Elementary School (Grades K-5)
Pleasant View Elementary (Grades PK-5)
RB Godley Elementary (Grades PK-5)
LINKS Academy (ALT School)

Students

Academics

Local region and statewide averages on standardized tests typically exceed the average scores of students in Godley.  In 2015-2016 State of Texas Assessments of Academic Readiness (STAAR) results, 70% of students in Godley ISD met Level II Satisfactory standards, compared with 77% in Region 11 and 75% in the state of Texas. The average SAT score of the class of 2015 was 1442, and the average ACT score was 22.2.

Demographics
In the 2015–2016 school year, the school district had a total of 1,765 students, ranging from early childhood education and pre-kindergarten through grade 12. The class of 2015 included 112 graduates; the annual drop-out rate across grades 9-12 was 1.0%.

As of the 2015–2016 school year, the ethnic distribution of the school district was 70.6% White, 23.3% Hispanic, 2.2% American Indian, 1.1% African American, 0.3% Asian, 0.1% Pacific Islander, and 2.5% from two or more races. Economically disadvantaged students made up 56.7% of the student body.

References

External links
Godley ISD - Official site.

School districts in Johnson County, Texas
School districts in Tarrant County, Texas
School districts in Hood County, Texas